Why Dontcha is the first studio album by power trio West, Bruce and Laing.

The album features "The Doctor", which received heavy FM radio airplay upon the album's release and became a signature song in live performance for the band. Other noteworthy tracks include "Out into the Fields", which Jack Bruce continued to perform in concert following West, Bruce and Laing's breakup (and which he re-recorded for his 2001 album Shadows in the Air), and "Love is Worth the Blues", a song loosely based on the chords and structure of The Rolling Stones' "Play with Fire".

Why Dontcha was West, Bruce and Laing's most successful album, reaching No. 26 on the Billboard U.S. album chart.

Track listing
Side one
 "Why Dontcha" (Leslie West, Jack Bruce, Corky Laing) – 3:02
 Leslie West – guitar, vocal
 Jack Bruce – bass
 Corky Laing – drums
 "Out into the Fields" (West, Bruce, Laing, Pete Brown) – 4:40
 Leslie West – guitar
 Jack Bruce – bass, lead and backing vocals, piano, harmonium, organ
 Corky Laing – drums
 "The Doctor" (West, Bruce, Laing, Sandra Palmer) – 4:30
 Leslie West – guitar, vocal
 Jack Bruce – bass
 Corky Laing – drums
 "Turn Me Over" (West, Bruce, Laing) – 2:43
 Leslie West – slide guitar
 Jack Bruce – acoustic bass, harmonica
 Corky Laing – drums, vocal
 "Third Degree" (Eddie Boyd, Willie Dixon) – 5:15 (shortened version on French LP – 4:42)
 Credited to Boyd alone on original pressings of the album.
 Leslie West – guitar
 Jack Bruce – bass, vocal, piano
 Corky Laing – drums

Side two
 "Shake Ma Thing (Rollin' Jack)" (West, Bruce, Laing) – 3:14
 Leslie West – guitar, lead vocal
 Jack Bruce – bass, lead and backing vocals, piano
 Corky Laing – drums
 "While You Sleep" (West, Bruce, Laing) – 3:24
 Leslie West – dobro, lead vocal, violin guitar
 Jack Bruce – acoustic bass, backing vocals, piano
 Corky Laing – rhythm guitar
 "Pleasure" (West, Bruce, Laing, Brown) – 4:02
 Leslie West – guitar
 Jack Bruce – bass, vocal, piano
 Corky Laing – drums
 "Love Is Worth the Blues" (West, Bruce, Laing) – 4:11
 Leslie West – guitar, vocal, violin guitar
 Jack Bruce – bass
 Corky Laing – drums
 "Pollution Woman" (West, Bruce, Laing, Brown) – 4:26
 Leslie West – electric and acoustic guitars
 Jack Bruce – bass, lead and backing vocals, acoustic guitar, ARP synthesizer
 Corky Laing – drums

Personnel
West, Bruce and Laing
 Leslie West – vocals, producer, acoustic guitar, electric guitar, Dobro
 Jack Bruce – bass, organ, harmonium, harp, vocals, choir, chorus, producer, ARP synthesizer, acoustic guitar, harmonica, piano
 Corky Laing – drums, rhythm guitar, vocals, producer

Technical personnel
 Andy Johns – producer, engineer
 Dan Turbeville – assistant engineer
 Ed Lee – art direction, design, photography

References

External links
 Music.com [Dead Link]
 West, Bruce and Laing discography & album credits at SoftShoe-Slim.com
 RollingStone.com [Dead Link]
 West, Bruce and Laing - Why Dontcha (1972) album review by Joe Viglione, credits & releases at AllMusic.com
 West, Bruce and Laing - Why Dontcha (1972) album releases & credits at Discogs.com
 West, Bruce and Laing - Why Dontcha (1972) album to be listened as stream at Play.Spotify.com

1972 debut albums
West, Bruce and Laing albums
Albums produced by Andy Johns
Columbia Records albums